Hexi District ( is a district in the south-western corner of urban Tianjin, People's Republic of China. It is bordered by Heping District in the north-west, Hedong District to the north-east and Nankai District to the west. As of 2020, the district has a total population of 822,174.

History 
During the Northern Song dynasty, this area was on the border with Jin, and belonged to the Hechi county. In 1110 it was transferred into Jinghai county, before got merged into Qianning county 3 years later. Following the Jingkang incident, Qianning county was ceded to Jin dynasty, who reinstated Jinghai county.

The region remained under the same administrative division through Yuan and Ming dynasty. In 1731, Qing government combined it into the newly created Tianjin county. 

In 1895, a portion of the region was ceded to Germany as concession. The concession was taken back by the Beiyang government in 1917, and made into the first special district. During the Japanese occupation, part of the first district was made into the sixth district in 1938, the first special district was renamed the tenth district in 1943, and later combined into the sixth district in 1944.

In 1956, People's Republic of China renamed the sixth district as the current Hexi district. During the Cultural Revolution, Hexi district was changed to Hongqi district from 1966 to 1968.

Administrative divisions
There are 14 subdistricts in the district:

Transportation

Metro
Hexi is currently served by two metro lines operated by Tianjin Metro:

  - Caijingdaxue, Huashanli, Fuxingmen, Chentangzhuang, Tucheng, Nanlou, Xiawafang
  - Wujiayao

Educational institutions

Major secondary schools
 Tianjin Experimental High School
 Tianjin Haihe High School
 Tianjin High School Affiliated to Beijing Normal University 
 Tianjin No.4 High School
 Tianjin No.41 High School
 Tianjin No.42 High School
 Tianjin Xinhua High School

International schools
 Tianjin International School

Universities
 Tianjin Foreign Studies University
 Tianjin University of Finance and Economics
 Tianjin University of Science and Technology 
 Tianjin University of Sport (Satellite campus, main campus in Jinghai.)
 Tianjin University of Technology and Education
 Tianjin University
 Nankai University
 Hebei University of Technology

Attractions
 Tianjin Amusement Park
 Tianjin Grand Theatre
 Jiefang South Park
 People's Park

Footnotes

Districts of Tianjin